Sauvosaaren Urheilupuisto is a football stadium in Kemi, Finland. It is the current home of Veikkausliiga club PS Kemi.

References

Football venues in Finland
Sports venues completed in 1934
Kemi
Kemi City F.C.
1934 establishments in Finland